Nehtaur Assembly constituency is one of the 403 constituencies of the Uttar Pradesh Legislative Assembly, India. It is a part of the Bijnor district and one of the five assembly constituencies in the Nagina Lok Sabha constituency. First election in this assembly constituency was held in 2012 after the "Delimitation of Parliamentary and Assembly Constituencies Order, 2008" was passed in the year 2008.

Wards / Areas
Extent of Nehtaur Assembly constituency is KC Haldaur & Haldaur MB of Bijnor Tehsil; KC Nehtaur, PCs Athai Shekh, Basera Dasu, Basera Khurd, Bhawanipur Tarkola, Mankua, Dhakka Karmachand, Kotra Tappa Kesho, Pipalsana, Raipur Maluk, Sedha, Sherpur Balla, Tapraula of Dhampur KC & Nehtaur MB of Dhampur Tehsil.

Members of the Legislative Assembly

Election results

2022

2017
17th Vidhan Sabha: 2017 General Elections

See also

Government of Uttar Pradesh
Nagina Lok Sabha constituency
Bijnor district
Sixteenth Legislative Assembly of Uttar Pradesh
Uttar Pradesh Legislative Assembly
Uttar Pradesh

References

External links
 

Assembly constituencies of Uttar Pradesh
Politics of Bijnor district
Constituencies established in 2008
2008 establishments in Uttar Pradesh